The  Jacksonville Sharks season was the fifth season for the franchise in the Arena Football League. The team was coached by Les Moss and played their home games at Jacksonville Veterans Memorial Arena. Finishing with a 7–11 record, this was the first season in the franchise's history that the team not only failed reach the playoffs, but also failed to win the division.

Standings

Schedule
The Sharks began the season by visiting the Orlando Predators on March 16. Their final regular season game was at home against the Los Angeles Kiss on July 26.

Roster

References

Jacksonville Sharks
Jacksonville Sharks
Jacksonville Sharks seasons